The women's 800 metres at the 2019 World Athletics Championships was held at the Khalifa International Stadium in Doha, Qatar, from 27 to 30 September 2019.

Summary
The new IAAF testosterone rule was essentially aimed at this event.  The defending champion, silver medalist and 4th place from 2017, the same athletes as the Olympic podium from 2016, were denied entry into this race.

From the gun in the final, Ajeé Wilson ran with purpose to take the lead at the break and control the race.  Natoya Goule and Raevyn Rogers fell in line behind her.  Around the second turn, Halimah Nakaayi ran around Rogers who slowed to become a blocking force in the pack, dropping back as far as next to last just after the bell.  Winnie Nanyondo led the charge to bridge the new gap behind the three leaders.  Down the backstretch, Goule started to challenge Wilson.  Wilson ran hard to hold her off.  Instead Goule was passed by the two Ugandans, Nakaayi on the inside and Nanyondo on the outside.  Through the final turn Nakaayi worked her way up to Wilson's shoulder, shadowed by Nayondo.  The diminutive Nakaayi executed the classic pass off the turn.  Wilson had no answer.  Nayondo was not gaining, but from seventh place at the head of the home stretch, Rogers was sprinting down lane 4, passing Nayondo, passing Wilson and getting to within a metre of Nakaayi before the finish.

Records
Before the competition records were as follows:

The following records were set at the competition:

Schedule
The event schedule, in local time (UTC+3), was as follows:

Results

Heats
Qualification: First 3 in each heat (Q) and the next 6 fastest (q) advanced to the semi-finals.

Semi-finals
The first 2 in each heat (Q) and the next two fastest (q) qualified for the final.

Final
The final was started on 30 September at 22:10.

References

800
800 metres at the World Athletics Championships